Bathycrinicola fernandinae is a species of sea snail, a marine gastropod mollusc in the family Eulimidae.

Distribution
This marine species occurs off the coasts of Florida in the southeast United States.

References

External links
 To World Register of Marine Species

Eulimidae
Gastropods described in 1927